Suana is a genus of moths in the family Lasiocampidae. The genus was erected by Francis Walker in 1855.

Description
Palpi long and broad. Antennae with branches gradually shortening to apex in male, which is extremely short throughout in female. Legs without spurs. Forewing long and narrow. Veins 6, 7 and 8 are stalked. Stalk of veins 9 and 10 are long. Hindwings with straight outer margin in males. Veins 4 and 5 stalked or from angle of cell. Vein 8 almost touching vein 7. One slightly accessory costal veinlet present.

Species
Suana concolor Walker, 1855
Suana riemsdyki Heylaerts, 1889
Suana zahmi Holloway & Bender, 1990

References

Lasiocampidae
Taxa described in 1855